Robert D. Raiford (December 27, 1927 – November 17, 2017) was an American radio broadcaster and actor, best known for his political/social commentaries delivered during The John Boy and Billy Big Show, a morning radio program heard on stations throughout the American South. He was from Concord, North Carolina and majored in communication at the University of South Carolina. Raiford got his start in broadcasting in 1944 by calling play by play at baseball games. His first real radio job was at WEGO (AM) in Concord, North Carolina. Raiford has appeared in 28 movies, often portraying judge characters. He frequently closed his commentaries with the line "Who says that? I say that!", which also served as the title of a book containing excerpts from these segments. Early in his career, Raiford worked for WTOP radio and WTOP-TV, both CBS News affiliates in Washington, D.C. His best-known work was a live radio broadcast on WTOP, a CBS Radio affiliate, covering the state funeral of President John F. Kennedy. He also worked at Charlotte radio station WBT, and hosted a show on WIST, which aired Charlotte's first telephone talk radio format. Raiford later taught Communications at the University of North Carolina at Charlotte. From 1978 to 1986, Raiford was a news anchor and talk show host for Charlotte's NBC television affiliate, known as WRET-TV and later WPCQ-TV during his tenure there (it is now WCNC-TV).

On the June 9, 2016, episode of The John Boy and Billy Big Show, John Isley ("John Boy") announced that Raiford had retired from the show, due to suffering a stroke the previous August that greatly affected his speech and mobility. Raiford had not delivered any commentaries during the intervening months, choosing to focus on his recovery instead.

Raiford died on November 17, 2017 at age 89.

Filmography

References

External links
Raiford's bio at the John Boy and Billy web site

Archive.org version of Raiford's bio at the John Boy and Billy web site

1927 births
2017 deaths
American male film actors
People from Concord, North Carolina
University of South Carolina alumni
University of North Carolina at Charlotte faculty